Sosticus is a genus of ground spiders that was first described by R. V. Chamberlin in 1922.

Species
 it contains ten species:
Sosticus californicus Platnick & Shadab, 1976 – California (USA)
Sosticus dherikanalensis Gajbe, 1979 – India
Sosticus insularis (Banks, 1895) (type) – USA, Canada
Sosticus jabalpurensis Bhandari & Gajbe, 2001 – India
Sosticus loricatus (L. Koch, 1866) – Europe, Caucasus, Russia (Europe to Far East), Iran, Central Asia, China. Introduced to North America
Sosticus nainitalensis Gajbe, 1979 – India
Sosticus pawani Gajbe, 1993 – India
Sosticus poonaensis Tikader, 1982 – India
Sosticus solanensis Gajbe, 1979 – India
Sosticus sundargarhensis Gajbe, 1979 – India

References

Araneomorphae genera
Gnaphosidae
Holarctic spiders
Spiders of the Indian subcontinent
Spiders of North America